Phaedropsis principaloides is a moth in the family Crambidae. It was described by Heinrich Benno Möschler in 1890. It is found in Puerto Rico and Cuba.

References

Spilomelinae
Moths described in 1890